Nymagee is a small town in the north west of New South Wales,  north west of Sydney,  south west of Nyngan and  south of Cobar. It is in the Shire of Cobar, The State Government area of Barwon and the Federal Government area of Parkes. At the 2016 census, Nymagee had a population of 101.

An area, COP4, of  around Nymagee has also been designated as an IBRA biogeographic subregion of the Cobar Peneplain biogeographic region.

History
Indigenous origins[edit source]
The Cobar area is part of the traditional territory of the Wongaibon people (within the Ngiyampaa language group associated with the arid plains and rocky hill country of the Central West area of NSW bordered by the Lachlan, Darling-Barwon and Bogan rivers). The name ‘Cobar’ is derived from a Ngiyampaa word – variously transcribed as kubbur, kuparr, gubarr or cuburra – for a water-hole and quarry where pigments of ochre, kaolin and blue and green copper minerals were mined for ceremonial use.[4][5] Other sources claim the Aboriginal word means ‘red earth’ or ‘burnt earth’ (the ochre used for ceremonial body paint).[6][7]

The Mount Grenfell Historic Site located north-west of Cobar is an important traditional meeting place with ceremonial significance. Extensive rock art at the site contains ochre and kaolin paintings of human and animal figures as well as hand stencils.[8] 

Nymagee was originally a copper mining town and in its peak supported a population of over 2200, half of those being Chinese migrants. However, when the mine closed in 1917 most of the residents left. By 1949, the inhabitants were thinking of Nymagee as a 'ghost town', even though it still possessed a hall, racecourse and social and sports clubs.

In 1999 local residents started an outback music festival to increase tourism and residents in the town. The first festival was visited by 600 tourists and the festival has since increased Nymagee's tourism by 60% and significantly increased the number of permanent residents

Nymagee is also home to "Clancy of the Overflow" a poem written by the famous bush poet Banjo Paterson.

Mining approval
In March 2023, approval was obtained for a mine just outside Nymagee.

References

External links

Cobar Shire
Mining towns in New South Wales